KWKK (100.9 FM) is a radio station airing an adult contemporary format licensed to Russellville, Arkansas.  The station is owned by Bobby Caldwell's East Arkansas Broadcasters, through licensee EAB of Russellville, LLC.

Formerly owned by Max Media, KWKK and five other stations were sold to East Arkansas Broadcasters for $3 million; the transaction was consummated on January 9, 2014.

References

External links
KWKK's official website

Mainstream adult contemporary radio stations in the United States
WKK
Russellville, Arkansas
1985 establishments in Arkansas
Radio stations established in 1985